Occitan, also known as lenga d'òc by its native speakers, and sometimes also referred to as Provençal, is a Romance language spoken in Southern France, Monaco, Italy's Occitan Valleys, as well as Spain's Val d'Aran; collectively, these regions are sometimes referred to as Occitània. It is also spoken in Calabria (Southern Italy) in a linguistic enclave of Cosenza area (mostly Guardia Piemontese). Some include Catalan in Occitan, as the distance between this language and some Occitan dialects (such as the Gascon language) is similar to the distance between different Occitan dialects. Catalan was considered a dialect of Occitan until the end of the 19th century and still today remains its closest relative.

Occitan is an official language of Catalonia, where a subdialect of Gascon known as Aranese is spoken (in the Val d'Aran). Since September 2010, the Parliament of Catalonia has considered Aranese Occitan to be the officially preferred language for use in the Val d'Aran.

Across history, the terms Limousin (Lemosin), Languedocien (Lengadocian), Gascon, and later Provençal (Provençal, Provençau or Prouvençau) have been used as synonyms for the whole of Occitan; nowadays, "Provençal" is understood mainly as the Occitan dialect spoken in Provence, in southeast France.

Unlike other Romance languages such as French or Spanish, there is no single written standard language called "Occitan", and Occitan has no official status in France, home to most of Occitania. Instead, there are competing norms for writing Occitan, some of which attempt to be pan-dialectal, whereas others are based on particular dialects. These efforts are hindered by the rapidly declining use of Occitan as a spoken language in much of southern France, as well as by the significant differences in phonology and vocabulary among different Occitan dialects.

According to the UNESCO Red Book of Endangered Languages, four of the six major dialects of Occitan (Provençal, Auvergnat, Limousin and Languedocien) are considered severely endangered, whereas the remaining two (Gascon and Vivaro-Alpine) are considered definitely endangered.

Name

History of the modern term
The name Occitan comes from the term  ("language of "),  being the Occitan word for yes. While the term would have been in use orally for some time after the decline of Latin, as far as historical records show, the Italian medieval poet Dante was the first to have recorded the term  in writing. In his , he wrote in Latin,  ("for some say , others , yet others say "), thereby highlighting three major Romance literary languages that were well known in Italy, based on each language's word for "yes", the  language (Occitan), the  language (French), and the  language (Italian). This was not, of course, the only defining characteristic of each group.

The word  came from Vulgar Latin  ("this"), while  originated from Latin  ("this [is] it"). Old Catalan and now the Catalan of Northern Catalonia also have . Other Romance languages derive their word for "yes" from the Latin , "thus [it is], [it was done], etc.", such as Spanish , Eastern Lombard , Italian , or Portuguese . French uses  to answer "yes" in response to questions that are asked in the negative sense: for example,  ("You have no brothers?" "But yes, I have seven.").

Other names for Occitan
For many centuries, the Occitan dialects (together with Catalan) were referred to as Limousin or Provençal, after the names of two regions lying within the modern Occitan-speaking area. After Frédéric Mistral's Félibrige movement in the 19th century, Provençal achieved the greatest literary recognition and so became the most popular term for Occitan.

According to Joseph Anglade, a philologist and specialist of medieval literature who helped impose the then archaic term Occitan as the sole correct name, the word Lemosin was first used to designate the language at the beginning of the 13th century by Catalan troubadour Raimon Vidal de Besalú(n) in his :
The French language is worthier and better suited for romances and pastourelles; but that (language) from Limousin is of greater value for writing poems and cançons and sirventés; and across the whole of the lands where our tongue is spoken, the literature in the Limousin language has more authority than any other dialect, wherefore I shall use this name in priority.

As for the word Provençal, it should not be taken as strictly meaning the language of Provence, but of Occitania as a whole, for "in the eleventh, the twelfth, and sometimes also the thirteenth centuries, one would understand under the name of Provence the whole territory of the old Provincia romana Gallia Narbonensis and even Aquitaine". The term first came into fashion in Italy.

Currently, linguists use the terms "Provençal" and "Limousin" strictly to refer to specific varieties within Occitania, keeping the name "Occitan" for the language as a whole. Many non-specialists, however, continue to refer to the language as Provençal, causing some confusion.

History

One of the oldest written fragments of the language found dates back to 960, in an official text that was mixed with Latin:

Carolingian litanies (c. 780), both written and sung in Latin, were answered to in Old Occitan by the audience.

Occitan was the vehicle for the influential poetry of the medieval troubadours and : At that time, the language was understood and celebrated throughout most of educated Europe. It was the maternal language of the English queen Eleanor of Aquitaine and kings Richard I (who wrote troubadour poetry) and John.

With the gradual imposition of French royal power over its territory, Occitan declined in status from the 14th century on. Occitan's greatest decline occurred during the French Revolution, in which diversity of language was considered a threat.

In 1903, the four Gospels,  i.e. Matthew, Mark, Luke and John were translated into the form of Provençal spoken in Cannes and Grasse. This was given the official Roman Catholic Imprimatur by vicar general A. Estellon.

The literary renaissance of the late 19th century (in which the 1904 Nobel Prize in Literature winner, Frédéric Mistral, among others, were involved in) was attenuated by World War I, when Occitan speakers spent extended periods of time alongside French-speaking comrades.

Origins

Because the geographical territory in which Occitan is spoken is surrounded by regions in which other Romance languages are used, external influences may have influenced its origin and development. Many factors favored its development as its own language.
 Mountains and seas: The range of Occitan is naturally bounded by the Mediterranean, Atlantic, Massif Central, Alps, and Pyrenees, respectively.
 Buffer zones: arid land, marshes, and areas otherwise impractical for farming and resistant of colonization provide further separation (territory between Loire and Garonne, the Aragon desert plateau).
 Constant populations: Some Occitan-speaking peoples are descended from people living in the region since prehistoric times.
 Negligible Celtic influence
 Ancient and long-term Roman influence: Julius Caesar once said that the people of Aquitaine could teach the Romans to speak better Latin. According to Müller, "France's linguistic separation began with Roman influence"
 Negligible Germanization: "The Frankish lexicon and its phonetic influence often end above the / line"

Occitan in the Iberian Peninsula
Catalan in Spain's northern and central Mediterranean coastal regions and the Balearic Islands is closely related to Occitan, sharing many linguistic features and a common origin (see Occitano-Romance languages). The language was one of the first to gain prestige as a medium for literature among Romance languages in the Middle Ages. Indeed, in the 12th and 13th centuries, Catalan troubadours such as Guerau de Cabrera, Guilhem de Bergadan, Guilhem de Cabestany, Huguet de Mataplana, Raimon Vidal de Besalú, Cerverí de Girona, Formit de Perpinhan, and Jofre de Foixà wrote in Occitan.

At the end of the 11th century, the Franks, as they were called at the time, started to penetrate the Iberian Peninsula through the Ways of St. James via Somport and Roncesvalles, settling on various locations of the Kingdoms of Navarre and Aragon, enticed by the privileges granted them by the Navarrese kings. They established themselves in ethnic boroughs where Occitan was used for everyday life, e.g. Pamplona, Sangüesa, Estella-Lizarra, etc. The language in turn became the status language chosen by the Navarrese kings, nobility, and upper classes for official and trade purposes in the period stretching from the early 13th century to late 14th century. These boroughs in Navarre may have been close-knit communities with little intermingling, in a context where the natural milieu was predominantly Basque-speaking. The variant chosen for written administrative records was a koiné based on the Languedocien dialect from Toulouse with fairly archaic linguistic features.

Evidence of a written account in Occitan from Pamplona centered on the burning of borough San Nicolas from 1258 survives today, while the History of the War of Navarre by Guilhem Anelier (1276) albeit written in Pamplona shows a linguistic variant from Toulouse.

Things turned out slightly otherwise in Aragon, where the sociolinguistic situation was different, with a clearer Basque-Romance bilingual situation (cf. Basques from the  cited c. 1000), but a receding Basque language (Basque banned in the marketplace of Huesca, 1349). While the language was chosen as a medium of prestige in records and official statements along with Latin in the early 13th century, Occitan faced competition from the rising local Romance vernacular, the Navarro-Aragonese, both orally and in writing, especially after Aragon's territorial conquests south to Zaragoza, Huesca and Tudela between 1118 and 1134. It resulted that a second Occitan immigration of this period was assimilated by the similar Navarro-Aragonese language, which at the same time was fostered and chosen by the kings of Aragon. The language fell into decay in the 14th century across the whole southern Pyrenean area and became largely absorbed into Navarro-Aragonese first and Castilian later in the 15th century, after their exclusive boroughs broke up (1423, Pamplona's boroughs unified).

Gascon-speaking communities were called in for trading purposes by Navarrese kings in the early 12th century to the coastal fringe extending from San Sebastian to the river Bidasoa, where they settled down. The language variant used was different from the ones used in Navarre, i.e. a Béarnese dialect of Gascon, with Gascon being in use far longer than in Navarre and Aragon until the 19th century, thanks mainly to the close ties held by Donostia and Pasaia with Bayonne.

Geographic distribution

Usage in France

Though it was still an everyday language for most of the rural population of southern France well into the 20th century, it is now spoken by about 100,000 people in France according to 2012 estimates. Nevertheless, there is a burgeoning movement in regions of France where Occitan was widely spoken to introduce educational programs to encourage young people in these regions to learn the language.

According to the 1999 census, there were 610,000 native speakers (almost all of whom were also native French speakers) and perhaps another million people with some exposure to the language. Following the pattern of language shift, most of this remainder is to be found among the eldest populations. Occitan activists (called Occitanists) have attempted, in particular with the advent of Occitan-language preschools (the Calandretas), to reintroduce the language to the young. 

Nonetheless, the number of proficient speakers of Occitan is thought to be dropping precipitously. A tourist in the cities in southern France is unlikely to hear a single Occitan word spoken on the street (or, for that matter, in a home), and is likely to only find the occasional vestige, such as street signs (and, of those, most will have French equivalents more prominently displayed), to remind them of the traditional language of the area.

Occitan speakers, as a result of generations of systematic suppression and humiliation (see Vergonha), seldom use the language in the presence of strangers, whether they are from abroad or from outside Occitania (in this case, often merely and abusively referred to as Parisiens or Nordistes, which means northerners). Occitan is still spoken by many elderly people in rural areas, but they generally switch to French when dealing with outsiders. 

Occitan's decline is somewhat less pronounced in Béarn because of the province's history (a late addition to the Kingdom of France), though even there the language is little spoken outside the homes of the rural elderly. The village of Artix is notable for having elected to post street signs in the local language.

Usage outside France

 In the Val d'Aran, in the northwest corner of Catalonia, Spain, Aranese (a variety of Gascon) is spoken. It is an official language of Catalonia together with Catalan and Spanish.
 In Italy, Occitan is also spoken in the Occitan Valleys (Alps) in Piedmont. An Occitan-speaking enclave also has existed at Guardia Piemontese (Calabria) since the 14th century. Italy adopted in 1999 a Linguistic Minorities Protection Law, or "Law 482", which includes Occitan; however, Italian is the dominant language. The Piedmontese language is extremely close to Occitan.
 In Monaco, some Occitan speakers coexist with remaining native speakers of Monégasque (Ligurian). French is the dominant language.
 Scattered Occitan-speaking communities have existed in different countries:
 There were Occitan-speaking colonies in Württemberg (Germany) since the 18th century, as a consequence of the Camisard war. The last Occitan speakers were heard in the 1930s.
 In the Spanish Basque country, Gascon was spoken in San Sebastián, perhaps as late as the early 20th century.
 In the Americas, Occitan speakers exist:
 in the United States, in Valdese, North Carolina
 in Canada, in Quebec where there are Occitan associations such as Association Occitane du Québec and Association des Occitans.
 Pigüé, Argentina – Community settled by 165 Occitans from the Rodez-Aveyron area of Cantal in the late 19th century.
 Guanajuato, Mexico – A sparse number of Occitan settlers are known to have settled in that state in the 19th century.

Traditionally Occitan-speaking areas
 Aquitaine – excluding the Basque-speaking part of the Pyrénées-Atlantiques in the western part of the department and a small part of Gironde where the langue d'oïl Saintongeais dialect is spoken.
 Midi-Pyrénées – including one of France's largest cities, Toulouse. There are a few street signs in Toulouse in Occitan, and since late 2009 the Toulouse Metro announcements are bilingual French-Occitan, but otherwise the language is almost never heard spoken on the street.
 Languedoc-Roussillon (from "Lenga d'òc") – including the areas around the medieval city of Carcassonne, excluding the large part of the Pyrénées-Orientales where Catalan is spoken (Fenolheda is the only Occitan-speaking area of the Pyrénées-Orientales).
 Provence-Alpes-Côte d'Azur – except for the Roya and Bévéra valleys, where there is a transitional dialect between Ligurian and Occitan, (Roiasc, including the Brigasc dialect of Ligurian). In the department of Alpes-Maritimes there were once isolated towns that spoke Ligurian, but those varieties are now extinct. The Mentonasc dialect of Ligurian, spoken in Menton, is a Ligurian transition dialect with a strong Occitan influence. French is the dominant language of the Alpes-Maritimes, Dauphiné and French Riviera areas.
 In Monaco, Occitan, imported by immigrants coexisted in the 19th and 20th centuries with the Monégasque dialect of Ligurian. French is the dominant language.
 Poitou-Charentes – Use of Occitan has declined here in the few parts it used to be spoken, replaced by French. Only Charente Limousine, the eastern part of the region, has resisted. The natural and historical languages of most of the region are the langues d'oïl Poitevin and Saintongeais.
 Limousin – A rural region (about 710,000 inhabitants) where Limousin is still spoken among the oldest residents. French is the dominant language.
 Auvergne – The language's use has declined in some urban areas. French is the dominant language. The department of Allier is divided between a southern, Occitan-speaking area and a northern, French-speaking area.
 Centre-Val de Loire – Some villages in the extreme South speak Occitan.
 Rhône-Alpes – While the south of the region is clearly Occitan-speaking, the central and northern Lyonnais, Forez and Dauphiné parts belong to the Franco-Provençal language area. French is the dominant language.
 Occitan Valleys (Piedmont) – Italian region where Occitan is spoken only in the southern and central Alpine valleys.
 Val d'Aran – part of Catalonia that speaks a mountain dialect of Gascon.

Number of speakers
The area where Occitan was historically dominant has approximately 16 million inhabitants. Recent research has shown it may be spoken as a first language by approximately 789,000 people in France, Italy, Spain and Monaco. In Monaco, Occitan coexists with Monégasque Ligurian, which is the other native language. Some researchers state that up to seven million people in France understand the language, whereas twelve to fourteen million fully spoke it in 1921. In 1860, Occitan speakers represented more than 39% of the whole French population (52% for francophones proper); they were still 26% to 36% in the 1920s and fewer than 7% in 1993.

Dialects

Occitan is fundamentally defined by its dialects, rather than being a unitary language. That point is very conflictual in Southern France, as many people do not recognize Occitan as a real language and think that the next defined "dialects" are languages. Like other languages that fundamentally exist at a spoken, rather than written, level (e.g. the Rhaeto-Romance languages, Franco-Provençal, Astur-Leonese, and Aragonese), every settlement technically has its own dialect, with the whole of Occitania forming a classic dialect continuum that changes gradually along any path from one side to the other. Nonetheless, specialists commonly divide Occitan into six main dialects:
 Gascon: includes the Béarnese and Aranese (spoken in Spain).
 Judeo-Gascon
 Languedocien (lengadocian)
 Limousin (lemosin)
 Auvergnat (auvernhat)
 Provençal (provençau or prouvençau), including the Niçard subdialect.
 Judeo-Provençal
 Vivaro-Alpine (vivaroaupenc), also known as "Alpine" or "Alpine Provençal", and sometimes considered a subdialect of Provençal

There are also significant lexical differences, where some dialects have words cognate with French, and others have Catalan and Spanish cognates. Nonetheless, there is a significant amount of mutual intelligibility.

Gascon is the most divergent, and descriptions of the main features of Occitan often consider Gascon separately. Max Wheeler notes that "probably only its copresence within the French cultural sphere has kept [Gascon] from being regarded as a separate language", and compares it to Franco-Provençal, which is considered a separate language from Occitan but is "probably not more divergent from Occitan overall than Gascon is".

There is no general agreement about larger groupings of these dialects.

Max Wheeler divides the dialects into two groups:
 Southwestern (Gascon and Languedocien), more conservative
 Northeastern (Limousin, Auvergnat, Provençal and Vivaro-Alpine), more innovative

Pierre Bec divides the dialects into three groups:
 Gascon, standing alone
 Southern Occitan (Languedocien and Provençal)
 Northern Occitan (Limousin, Auvergnat, Vivaro-Alpine)

Bec also notes that some linguists prefer a "supradialectal" classification that groups Occitan with Catalan as a part of a wider Occitano-Romanic group. One such classification posits three groups:
 "Arverno-Mediterranean" (arvèrnomediterranèu), same as Wheeler's northeastern group, i.e. Limousin, Auvergnat, Provençal and Vivaro-Alpine
 "Central Occitan" (occitan centrau), Languedocien, excepting the Southern Languedocien subdialect
 "Aquitano-Pyrenean" (aquitanopirenenc), Southern Languedocien, Gascon and Catalan
According to this view, Catalan is an ausbau language that became independent from Occitan during the 13th century, but originates from the Aquitano-Pyrenean group.

Domergue Sumien proposes a slightly different supradialectal grouping.
 Arverno-Mediterranean (arvèrnomediterranèu), same as in Bec and Wheeler, divided further:
 Niçard-Alpine (niçardoaupenc), Vivaro-Alpine along with the Niçard subdialect of Provençal
 Trans-Occitan (transoccitan), the remainder of Provençal along with Limousin and Auvergnat
 Pre-Iberian (preïberic)
 Central Occitan (occitan centrau), same as in Bec
 Aquitano-Pyrenean (aquitanopirenenc), same as in Bec

IETF dialect tags
: Old Occitan (until the 14th century).
: Judeo-Occitan

Several IETF language variant tags have been registered:
 : Aranese.
 : Auvergnat.
 : Cisalpine, northwestern Italy.
 : Croissant
 : Gascon.
 : Leimousin.
 : Languedocien. 
 : Niçard.
 : Provençal.
 : Vivaro-Alpine.

Codification

Standardization
All regional varieties of the Occitan language have a written form; thus, Occitan can be considered as a pluricentric language. Standard Occitan, also called occitan larg (i.e., 'wide Occitan') is a synthesis that respects and admits soft regional adaptations (which are based on the convergence of previous regional koinés). The standardization process began with the publication of Gramatica occitana segon los parlars lengadocians ("Grammar of the Languedocien Dialect") by Louis Alibert (1935), followed by the Dictionnaire occitan-français selon les parlers languedociens ("French-Occitan dictionary according to Languedocien") by the same author (1966), completed during the 1970s with the works of Pierre Bec (Gascon), Robèrt Lafont (Provençal), and others. However, the process has not yet been completed as of the present. Standardization is mostly supported by users of the classical norm. Due to the strong situation of diglossia, some users thusly reject the standardization process, and do not conceive Occitan as a language that can be standardized as per other standardized languages.

Writing system

There are two main linguistic norms currently used for Occitan, one (known as "classical"), which is based on that of Medieval Occitan, and one (sometimes known as "Mistralian", due to its use by Frédéric Mistral), which is based on modern French orthography. Sometimes, there is conflict between users of each system.
 The classical norm (or less exactly classical orthography) has the advantage of maintaining a link with earlier stages of the language, and reflects the fact that Occitan is not a variety of French. It is used in all Occitan dialects. It also allows speakers of one dialect of Occitan to write intelligibly for speakers of other dialects (e.g. the Occitan for day is written jorn in the classical norm, but could be jour, joun, journ, or even yourn, depending on the writer's origin, in Mistralian orthography). The Occitan classical orthography and the Catalan orthography are quite similar: They show the very close ties of both languages. The digraphs lh and nh, used in the classical orthography, were adopted by the orthography of Portuguese, presumably by Gerald of Braga, a monk from Moissac, who became bishop of Braga in Portugal in 1047, playing a major role in modernizing written Portuguese using classical Occitan norms.
 The Mistralian norm (or less exactly Mistralian orthography) has the advantage of being similar to that of French, in which most Occitan speakers are literate. Now, it is used mostly in the Provençal/Niçard dialect, besides the classical norm. It has also been used by a number of eminent writers, particularly in Provençal. However, it is somewhat impractical, because it is based mainly on the Provençal dialect and also uses many digraphs for simple sounds, the most notable one being ou for the  sound, as it is in French, written as o under the classical orthography.

There are also two other norms but they have a lesser audience. The Escòla dau Pò norm (or Escolo dóu Po norm) is a simplified version of the Mistralian norm and is used only in the Occitan Valleys (Italy), besides the classical norm. The Bonnaudian norm (or écriture auvergnate unifiée, EAU) was created by Pierre Bonnaud and is used only in the Auvergnat dialect, besides the classical norm.

Note that Catalan version was translated from the Spanish, while the Occitan versions were translated from the French. The second part of the Catalan version may also be rendered as "Són dotades de raó i de consciència, i els cal actuar entre si amb un esperit de fraternitat", showing the similarities between Occitan and Catalan.

Orthography IETF subtags
Several IETF language subtags have been registered for the different orthographies:
 : Classical Occitan orthography.
 : Italian-inspired Occitan orthography.
 : Mistralian-inspired Occitan orthography.

Debates concerning linguistic classification and orthography
The majority of scholars think that Occitan constitutes a single language. Some authors, constituting a minority, reject this opinion and even the name Occitan, thinking that there is a family of distinct  rather than dialects of a single language.

Many Occitan linguists and writers, particularly those involved with the pan-Occitan movement centered on the Institut d'Estudis Occitans, disagree with the view that Occitan is a family of languages; instead they believe Limousin, Auvergnat, Languedocien, Gascon, Provençal and Vivaro-Alpine are dialects of a single language. Although there are indeed noticeable differences between these varieties, there is a very high degree of mutual intelligibility between them  partly because they share a common literary history; furthermore, academic and literary circles have identified them as a collective linguistic entity—the —for centuries.

Some Provençal authors continue to support the view that Provençal is a separate language. Nevertheless, the vast majority of Provençal authors and associations think that Provençal is a part of Occitan.

This debate about the status of Provençal should not be confused with the debate concerning the spelling of Provençal.
 The classical orthography is phonemic and diasystemic, and thus more pan-Occitan. It can be used for (and adapted to) all Occitan dialects and regions, including Provençal. Its supporters think that Provençal is a part of Occitan.
 The Mistralian orthography of Provençal is more or less phonemic but not diasystemic and is closer to the French spelling and therefore more specific to Provençal; its users are divided between the ones who think that Provençal is a part of Occitan and the ones who think that Provençal is a separate language.

The question of Gascon is similar. Gascon presents a number of significant differences from the rest of the language; but, despite these differences, Gascon and other Occitan dialects have very important common lexical and grammatical features, so authors such as Pierre Bec argue that they could never be considered as different as, for example, Spanish and Italian. In addition, Gascon's being included in Occitan despite its particular differences can be justified because there is a common elaboration (Ausbau) process between Gascon and the rest of Occitan. The vast majority of the Gascon cultural movement considers itself as a part of the Occitan cultural movement. And the official status of Val d'Aran (Catalonia, Spain), adopted in 1990, says that Aranese is a part of Gascon and Occitan. A grammar of Aranese by Aitor Carrera, published in 2007 in Lleida, presents the same view.

The exclusion of Catalan from the Occitan sphere, even though Catalan is closely related, is justified because there has been a consciousness of its being different from Occitan since the later Middle Ages and because the elaboration (Ausbau) processes of Catalan and Occitan (including Gascon) have been quite distinct since the 20th century. Nevertheless, other scholars point out that the process that led to the affirmation of Catalan as a distinct language from Occitan started during the period when the pressure to include Catalan-speaking areas in a mainstream Spanish culture was at its greatest.

The answer to the question of whether Gascon or Catalan should be considered dialects of Occitan or separate languages has long been a matter of opinion or convention, rather than based on scientific ground. However, two recent studies support Gascon's being considered a distinct language. For the very first time, a quantifiable, statistics-based approach was applied by Stephan Koppelberg in attempt to solve this issue. Based on the results he obtained, he concludes that Catalan, Occitan, and Gascon should all be considered three distinct languages. More recently, Y. Greub and J.P. Chambon (Sorbonne University, Paris) demonstrated that the formation of Proto-Gascon was already complete at the eve of the 7th century, whereas Proto-Occitan was not yet formed at that time. These results induced linguists to do away with the conventional classification of Gascon, favoring the "distinct language" alternative. Both studies supported the early intuition of the late Kurt Baldinger, a specialist of both medieval Occitan and medieval Gascon, who recommended that Occitan and Gascon be classified as separate languages.

Linguistic characterization

Jules Ronjat has sought to characterize Occitan with 19 principal, generalizable criteria. Of those, 11 are phonetic, five morphologic, one syntactic, and two lexical. For example, close rounded vowels are rare or absent in Occitan. This characteristic often carries through to an Occitan speaker's French, leading to a distinctive méridional accent. Unlike French, it is a pro-drop language, allowing the omission of the subject (: I sing;  you sing)—though, at least in Gascon, the verb must be preceded by an "enunciative" in place of the pronoun,  for questions,  for observations,  for other occasions: ,  (I am),  (He/she is?),  (We are.). Among these 19 discriminating criteria, 7 are different from Spanish, 8 from Italian, 12 from Franco-Provençal, and 16 from French.

Features of Occitan
Most features of Occitan are shared with either French or Catalan, or both.

Features of Occitan as a whole
Examples of pan-Occitan features shared with French, but not Catalan:

Examples of pan-Occitan features shared with Catalan, but not French:
 Stressed Latin  was preserved (Lat.  > Oc. mar, Fr. mer).
 Intervocalic -- was lenited to  rather than lost (Lat.  > Oc. vida, Fr. vie).

Examples of pan-Occitan features not shared with Catalan or French:
 Original  preserved.
 Final  becomes  (note in Valencian (Catalan),  may appear in word-final unstressed position, in a process of vowel harmony).
Diphthongization also occurred before palatals, as in French and Catalan.
 Various assimilations in consonant clusters (e.g.  in Occitan, pronounced  in conservative Languedocien).

Features of some Occitan dialects
Examples of dialect-specific features of the northerly dialects shared with French, but not Catalan:
 Loss of final consonants.
 Vocalization of syllable-final nasals to nasal vowels.
 Uvularization of some or all  sounds.

Examples of dialect-specific features of the southerly dialects (or some of them) shared with Catalan, but not French:
 Latin  become .
 Betacism:  and  merge (feature shared with Spanish and some Catalan dialects; except for Balearic, Valencian and Algherese Catalan, where  is preserved).
 Intervocalic voiced stops  (from Latin ) become voiced fricatives .
 Loss of word-final single  (but not , e.g. an "year" < ).

Examples of Gascon-specific features not shared with French or Catalan:
 Latin initial  changed into  (Lat.  > Gasc. hilh). The Gascon  has retained its aspiration.
This also happened in Portuguese and Galician (and moreover also in Basque).
This is a unique characteristic of Gascon and of certain Aragonese dialects.

Examples of other dialect-specific features not shared with French or Catalan:
This appears to represent a transitional stage before nasalization, and occurs especially in the southerly dialects other than Gascon (which still maintains different final nasals, as in Catalan).
 Former intervocalic  (from Latin ) becomes /z/ (most dialects, but not Gascon).

Comparison with other Romance languages and English

Lexicon
A comparison of terms and word counts between languages is not easy, as it is impossible to count the number of words in a language. (See Lexicon, Lexeme, Lexicography for more information.)

Some have claimed around 450,000 words exist in the Occitan language, a number comparable to English (the Webster's Third New International Dictionary, Unabridged with 1993 addenda reaches 470,000 words, as does the Oxford English Dictionary, Second edition). The Merriam-Webster website estimates that the number is somewhere between 250,000 and 1 million words.

The magazine Géo (2004, p. 79) claims that American English literature can be more easily translated into Occitan than French, excluding modern technological terms that both languages have integrated.

A comparison of the lexical content can find more subtle differences between the languages. For example, Occitan has 128 synonyms related to cultivated land, 62 for wetlands, and 75 for sunshine (Géo). The language went through an eclipse during the Industrial Revolution, as the vocabulary of the countryside became less important. At the same time, it was disparaged as a patois. Nevertheless, Occitan has also incorporated new words into its lexicon to describe the modern world.

Differences between Occitan and Catalan
The separation of Catalan from Occitan is seen by some as largely politically (rather than linguistically) motivated. However, the variety that has become standard Catalan differs from the one that has become standard Occitan in a number of ways. Here are just a few examples:
 Phonology 
 Standard Catalan (based on Central Eastern Catalan) is unique in that Latin short e developed into a close vowel  (é) and Latin long e developed into an open vowel  (è); that is precisely the reverse of the development that took place in Western Catalan dialects and the rest of the Romance languages, including Occitan. Thus Standard Catalan ésser  corresponds to Occitan èsser/èstre  'to be;' Catalan   corresponds to Occitan carrièra  'street', but it is also carriera , in Provençal.
 The distinctly Occitan development of word-final -a, pronounced  in standard Occitan (chifra 'figure' ), did not occur in general Catalan (which has xifra ). However, some Occitan varieties also lack that feature, and some Catalan (Valencian) varieties have the  pronunciation, mostly by vowel harmony.
 When in Catalan word stress falls in the antepenultimate syllable, in Occitan the stress is moved to the penultimate syllable: for example, Occitan pagina  vs. Catalan pàgina , "page". However, there are exceptions. For example, some varieties of Occitan (such as that of Nice) keep the stress on the antepenultimate syllable (pàgina), and some varieties of Catalan (in Northern Catalonia) put the stress on the penultimate syllable (pagina).
 Diphthongization has evolved in different ways: Occitan paire vs. Catalan pare 'father;' Occitan carrièra (carrèra, carrèira) vs. Catalan carrera.
 Although some Occitan dialects lack the voiceless postalveolar fricative phoneme , others such as southwestern Occitan have it: general Occitan caissa  vs. Catalan caixa  and southwestern Occitan caissa, caisha , 'box.' Nevertheless, some Valencian dialects like Northern Valencian lack that phoneme too and generally substitute : caixa  (Standard Valencian) ~  (Northern Valencian).
 Occitan has developed the close front rounded vowel  as a phoneme, often (but not always) corresponding to Catalan : Occitan musica  vs. Catalan música .
Similarly, Algherese Catalan neutralizes palatal consonants in word-final position as well. Non-central varieties of Occitan, however, may have a palatal realization (e.g. filh, hilh ). 
That feature is perhaps one of the most distinctive characteristics of Catalan amongst the Romance languages, shared only with Asturian, Leonese and Mirandese. However, some transitional varieties of Occitan, near the Catalan area, also have initial .
 While  is always clear in Occitan, in Catalan it tends to be velarized  ("dark l").
 Standard Eastern Catalan has a neutral vowel  whenever a or e occur in unstressed position (passar , 'to happen', but passa , 'it happens'), and also  whenever o or u occur in unstressed position, e.g. obrir , 'to open', but obre , 'you open'. However, that does not apply to Western Catalan dialects, whose vowel system usually retains the a/e distinction in unstressed position, or to Northern Catalan dialects, whose vowel system does not retain the o/u distinction in stressed position, much like Occitan.
 Morphology
 Verb conjugation is slightly different, but there is a great variety amongst dialects. Medieval conjugations were much closer. A characteristic difference is the ending of the second person plural, which is -u in Catalan but -tz in Occitan. 
 Occitan tends to add an analogical -a to the feminine forms of adjectives that are invariable in standard Catalan: for example, Occitan legal / legala vs. Catalan legal / legal.
 Catalan has a distinctive past tense formation, known as the 'periphrastic preterite', formed from a variant of the verb 'to go' followed by the infinitive of the verb: donar 'to give,' va donar 'he gave.' That has the same value as the 'normal' preterite shared by most Romance languages, deriving from the Latin perfect tense: Catalan donà 'he gave.' The periphrastic preterite, in Occitan, is an archaic or a very local tense.
 Orthography
 The writing systems of the two languages differ slightly. The modern Occitan spelling recommended by the Institut d'Estudis Occitans and the Conselh de la Lenga Occitana is designed to be a pan-Occitan system, and the Catalan system recommended by the Institut d'Estudis Catalans and Acadèmia Valenciana de la Llengua is specific to Catalan and Valencian. For example, in Catalan, word-final -n is omitted, as it is not pronounced in any dialect of Catalan (Català, Occità); central Occitan also drops word-final -n, but it is retained in the spelling, as some eastern and western dialects of Occitan still have it (Catalan, Occitan). Some digraphs are also written in a different way such as the sound , which is ll in Catalan (similar to Spanish) and lh in Occitan (similar to Portuguese) or the sound  written ny in Catalan and nh in Occitan.

Occitano-Romance linguistic group
Despite these differences, Occitan and Catalan remain more or less mutually comprehensible, especially when written – more so than either is with Spanish or French, for example, although this is mainly a consequence of using the classical (orthographical) norm of the Occitan, which is precisely focused in showing the similarities between the Occitan dialects with Catalan. Occitan and Catalan form a common diasystem (or a common Abstandsprache), which is called Occitano-Romance, according to the linguist Pierre Bec. Speakers of both languages share early historical and cultural heritage.

The combined Occitano-Romance area is 259,000 km2, with a population of 23 million. However, the regions are not equal in terms of language speakers. According to Bec 1969 (pp. 120–121), in France, no more than a quarter of the population in counted regions could speak Occitan well, though around half understood it; it is thought that the number of Occitan users has decreased dramatically since then. By contrast, in the Catalonia administered by the Government of Catalonia, nearly three-quarters of the population speak Catalan and 95% understand it.

Preservation
In the modern era, Occitan has become a rare and highly threatened language. Its users are clustered almost exclusively in Southern France, and it is unlikely that any monolingual speakers remain. In the early 1900s, the French government attempted to restrict the use and teaching of many minority languages, including Occitan, in public schools. While the laws have since changed, with bilingual education returning for regions with unique languages in 1993, this movement caused serious decline in the number of Occitan speakers. The majority of living speakers are older adults.

Samples

One of the most notable passages of Occitan in Western literature occurs in the 26th canto of Dante's Purgatorio in which the troubadour Arnaut Daniel responds to the narrator:
Tan m'abellís vostre cortés deman, / qu'ieu no me puesc ni voill a vos cobrire. / Ieu sui Arnaut, que plor e vau cantan; / consirós vei la passada folor, / e vei jausen lo joi qu'esper, denan. / Ara vos prec, per aquella valor / que vos guida al som de l'escalina, / sovenha vos a temps de ma dolor.
Modern Occitan: Tan m'abelís vòstra cortesa demanda, / que ieu non-pòdi ni vòli m'amagar de vos. / Ieu soi Arnaut, que plori e vau cantant; / consirós vesi la foliá passada, / e vesi joiós lo jorn qu'espèri, davant. / Ara vos prègui, per aquela valor / que vos guida al som de l'escalièr, / sovenhatz-vos tot còp de ma dolor.

The above strophe translates to:
So pleases me your courteous demand, / I cannot and I will not hide me from you. / I am Arnaut, who weep and singing go;/ Contrite I see the folly of the past, / And joyous see the hoped-for day before me. / Therefore do I implore you, by that power/ Which guides you to the summit of the stairs, / Be mindful to assuage my suffering!

Another notable Occitan quotation, this time from Arnaut Daniel's own 10th Canto:
"Ieu sui Arnaut qu'amas l'aura
e chatz le lebre ab lo bou
e nadi contra suberna"
Modern Occitan:
"Ieu soi Arnaut qu'aimi l'aura
e caci [chaci] la lèbre amb lo buòu
e nadi contra subèrna.

Translation:
"I am Arnaut who loves the wind,
and chases the hare with the ox,
and swims against the torrent."

French writer Victor Hugo's classic Les Misérables also contains some Occitan. In Part One, First Book, Chapter IV, "Les œuvres semblables aux paroles", one can read about Monseigneur Bienvenu:
"Né provençal, il s'était facilement familiarisé avec tous les patois du midi. Il disait: — E ben, monsur, sètz saget? comme dans le bas Languedoc. — Ont anaratz passar? comme dans les basses Alpes. — Pòrti un bon moton amb un bon formatge gras, comme dans le haut Dauphiné. [...] Parlant toutes les langues, il entrait dans toutes les âmes."

Translation:
"Born a Provençal, he easily familiarized himself with the dialect of the south. He would say, E ben, monsur, sètz saget? as in lower Languedoc; Ont anaratz passar? as in the Basses-Alpes; Pòrti un bon moton amb un bon formatge gras as in upper Dauphiné. [...] As he spoke all tongues, he entered into all hearts."
E ben, monsur, sètz saget?: So, Mister, everything's fine?
Ont anaratz passar?: Which way will you go?
Pòrti un bon moton amb un bon formatge gras: I brought some fine mutton with a fine fat cheese

The Spanish playwright Lope de Rueda included a Gascon servant for comical effect in one of his short pieces, La generosa paliza.

John Barnes's Thousand Cultures science fiction series (A Million Open Doors, 1992; Earth Made of Glass, 1998; The Merchants of Souls, 2001; and The Armies of Memory, 2006), features Occitan.
So does the 2005 best-selling novel Labyrinth by English author Kate Mosse. It is set in Carcassonne, where she owns a house and spends half of the year.

The French composer Joseph Canteloube created five sets of folk songs entitled Songs of the Auvergne, in which the lyrics are in the Auvergne dialect of Occitan. The orchestration strives to conjure vivid pastoral scenes of yesteryear.

Michael Crichton features Occitan in his Timeline novel.

See also

 Baìo
 History of the Basque language
 Languages of France
 Languages of Italy
 Languages of Spain
 Occitan cross
 Occitan cuisine
 Language policy in France

Notes

Explanatory footnotes

Bibliography
 
 
 
 
 
 
 
 Ursula Reutner: "‘Minor‘ Gallo-Romance Languages‘“. In: Lebsanft, Franz/Tacke, Felix: Manual of Standardization in the Romance Languages. Berlin: de Gruyter (Manuals of Romance Linguistics 24), 773–807.

External links

 Orbilat.com – Overview and grammar of Occitan
 Occitanet.free.fr – a guide to the language
 Globegate.UTM.edu – Troubadour & Early Occitan Literature
 Ostaldoccitania.net  – The house of Occitan associations of Toulouse
 Eonet.ne – "LexRomEdic", electronic version of Lexique Roman of Rainouard (A provisional version is available).
 arrilemosin.fr – Occitan Limousin group website with maps and vocabulary

 
Languages of Andorra
Languages of France
Languages of Italy
Languages of Piedmont
Languages of Catalonia